"Pasilyo" is a song recorded by Filipino band SunKissed Lola. It was released on October 28, 2022, by Ditto Music as their third single overall. The song was written by Alvin Serito and collaboratively produced by the band members. Lead vocalist Dan Ombao explained that the concept of the song is to live the dream of being married someday and being someone's certainty.

"Pasilyo" consists of a waltz structure as a kundiman ballad with modern jazz rock elements. The song was a commercial success, reaching number one on Spotify Philippines and breaking the record for the biggest single-day streams for an OPM song. It topped Billboard Philippines Songs, making SunKissed Lola the first Filipino band in history to lead the chart.

The track also became a viral hit on TikTok and is considered the band's signature hit, being performed multiple times in live performances.

Background 
On August 19, SunKissed Lola officially made its debut in streaming platforms with the release of their first single "Makalimutan Ka", followed up by the track "HKP" on September 16. The band announced on October 17 on their social media sites its plans to launch "Pasilyo" as the finale of its debut trilogy, setting its release date to October 28.

Composition 

"Pasilyo" is described as a "wedding anthem", a waltz ballad with modern jazz rock elements capturing the OPM sound. The song is in the key of D major, playing at 120 bpm with a running time of 4:30 minutes.

The lyrics was written by lead vocalist Alvin Serito and explained the idea of marriage and walking down the aisle with your partner as part of one's prayers. The song is notable for repeating the word "ikaw" (you) numerous times in its chorus, stressing the importance of one's partner as their only wish. Guitarist Dan Ombao added how they envisioned its message as "that endearing feeling of being someone's 'sure thing' in this world full of uncertainties."

Commercial performance 

A month after its release, "Pasilyo" debuted on top of the Spotify Viral 50 - Philippines chart dated November 23, 2022, remaining for eight consecutive days. It reached number one on both daily and weekly charts of Spotify Philippines and broke the record for the biggest single-day streams for an OPM song in Spotify history on February 11, 2023, with 585,829 plays. The following day, it gained 606,923 streams, becoming the first local song to break the 600K mark. On the week of Valentine's Day, the song rose to number one on the weekly Top Songs - Philippines chart of Spotify, replacing "Kill Bill" by SZA. It set the mark for the biggest weekly streams for an OPM song in Spotify with 4,069,788 plays. The song continued to eclipse its records, reaching its peaks on February 24 with 691,069 daily streams and on March 2 with 4,303,718 weekly streams. The song was fueled by its usage on TikTok, amassing 380,000 videos during Valentine's week. As of March 8, 2023, its lyric video on YouTube has 17 million views.

The song debuted at number 15 in Billboard Philippines Songs on the chart dated January 21, 2023. The following week, it entered the top ten at number 6 with gains in streams and downloads. "Pasilyo" finally rose to number one in the Philippines in its seventh week, heavily assisted by its streaming peak and making SunKissed Lola the first OPM band to reach the summit. It was succeeded on the top spot by "Die for You" by The Weeknd and Ariana Grande on the chart dated March 11.

Live performances 

The group held their first major performance of "Pasilyo" online in iWant ASAP on December 4, 2022. They recorded their Wish 107.5 Bus performance of the song on December 13 in Eton Centris, Quezon City. The recording was uploaded on December 27, going viral and accumulating 2 million views on YouTube as of March 8, 2023.

The band also played "Pasilyo" in their first mall show in Ayala Malls Harbor Point, Subic Bay on January 21, 2023. The track is also included in their setlist for Circus Music Festival on April 22.

Track listing

Credits and personnel 
Adapted from the single's lyric video notes.

SunKissed Lola
Alvin Serito - lead vocals, guitar
Dan Ombao - backing vocals, guitar
Laura Lacbain - backing vocals
Danj Quimson - bass guitar
Genson Viloria - drums

Additional personnel 
Shadiel Chan - mixing
Jan Aries Agadier Fuertez - mastering
Jael Mendoza - art

Charts

References 

2022 songs
2022 singles
Tagalog-language songs
Filipino language songs
Philippine pop songs
2020s ballads
Number-one singles in the Philippines